GTH may refer to:

 Global Telecom Holding, a Dutch telecommunications company
 Global Transportation Hub Authority, a crown corporation of Saskatchewan, Canada
 GMM Tai Hub, a defunct Thai film studio